Expositor or Expository may refer to:

Publications
An English Expositor ( 1616), an early dictionary
Brantford Expositor, a newspaper in Brantford, Ontario
Nauvoo Expositor, a former newspaper in Nauvoo, Illinois
Review & Expositor ( 1904), an academic journal of theology
The Expository Times (est. 1889), an academic journal of theology
Vine's Expository Dictionary (pub 1940), a cross reference of English New Testament words to original Greek texts

Other
Expository address, a competitive debate event in the National Forensic League
Expository preaching, a form of preaching that explains a passage of scripture
EcoCentro Expositor Querétaro, an exposition centre in El Marqués, Querétaro

See also
Exposition (narrative)